Prince Worawannakon, the Prince Narathip Praphanphong (20 November 1861 – 11 October 1931) was a Prince of Siam (later Thailand). He was a member of Siamese royal family is a son of King Mongkut and Chao Chom Manda Khian.
His mother was Chao Chom Manda Khian Sirivan (is a daughter of On Sirivan and Im Sirivan). His full name was Phra Chao Borommawong Thoe Phra Ong Chao Worawannakon Khommaphra Narathip Praphanphong.

One of his sons is Prince Wan Waithayakon, who was the President of the Eleventh Session of the United Nations General Assembly (1956–1957).  Prince Narathip died 11 October 1931 at the age 69.

References 
 ราชกิจจานุเบกษา, ประกาศตั้งกรมพระเจ้าน้องยาเธอ กรมหมื่นนราธิปประพันธุพงษ์, เล่ม 6, ตอน 36, 8 ธันวาคม พ.ศ. 2432, หน้า 304

Thai male Phra Ong Chao
19th-century Chakri dynasty
20th-century Chakri dynasty
Recipients of the Dushdi Mala Medal, Pin of Arts and Science
People from Bangkok
Members of the Privy Council of Thailand
1861 births
1931 deaths
 
Children of Mongkut
Sons of kings